Arthur L. Beaudet is a founder and CEO of Luna Genetics. He is a past professor and chair of molecular and human genetics at Baylor College of Medicine. He was inducted into the Institute of Medicine in 1995, the Society of Scholars in 2008 and into the National Academy of Sciences in 2011.

Early life and education 
Beaudet was born in Woonsocket, Rhode Island. He received a bachelor's degree from the College of the Holy Cross in 1963 and received his MD from Yale Medical School in 1967. He completed a residency in pediatrics at Johns Hopkins Hospital in 1969 and a postdoctoral fellowship at the National Institutes of Health two years later. After his NIH fellowship ended in 1971, Beaudet began his affiliation with Baylor. He retired from Baylor in January 2020.

Research 
Beaudet began his research in the 1960s with studies on protein synthesis. In the 1970s, Beaudet et al. demonstrated mutations in cultured somatic cells; he has also conducted much research on inborn errors of metabolism, particularly urea cycle disorders. In 1988, Beaudet's laboratory published a paper regarding the mechanism by which uniparental disomy might cause certain types of human genetic disease. This paper proposed four mechanisms for uniparental disomy, each of which has since been shown to occur. His group co-discovered that the UBE3A gene was inactivated as the cause of Angelman syndrome, and that deletion of the snoRNAs likely contributes to the Prader-Willi phenotype. In collaboration with Isis (now Ionis) Pharmaceuticals he demonstrated that oligonucleotides could be used to activate the paternal allele of Ube3a in the mouse as a possible therapeutic correction in Angelman syndrome.

More recently, Beaudet has published research on the possible association between the deficiency of a carnitine biosynthesis gene and risk of autism in boys, and has contended that some of these cases of autism may be preventable through carnitine supplementation. Beaudet has also developed a test which enables doctors to detect whether or not a child was conceived as a result of incest without testing either parent. Beaudet has worked for over a decade trying to develop a commercial form of cell-based noninvasive prenatal testing using fetal cells in the mother’s blood during the first trimester. He now pursues this goal at Luna Genetics.

References 

Year of birth missing (living people)
Living people
Baylor College of Medicine faculty
People from Woonsocket, Rhode Island
American geneticists
Yale School of Medicine alumni
College of the Holy Cross alumni
Members of the United States National Academy of Sciences
Members of the National Academy of Medicine